Lesley Boone (born February 25, 1968) is an American producer and television actress, best known for her roles as Marlene Gilbert on the Fox sitcom Babes (1990–1991), as Molly Hudson in the NBC comedy-drama Ed (2000–2004) and as Rose Roberts in the ABC action/adventure show Agent Carter (2015–2016) included in the Marvel Cinematic Universe.

Personal life
Boone married producer/director Larry Teng in 2005; they met on the set of Ed. They divorced in 2013.

Filmography

Awards and nominations

References

External links
 

1968 births
Actresses from Los Angeles
American film actresses
American television actresses
Living people
20th-century American actresses
21st-century American actresses